National Highway 730A, commonly referred to as NH 730A is a national highway in  India. It is a spur road of National Highway 30. NH-730A traverses the state of Uttar Pradesh in India.

Route 
 Maigalganj, Pawayan, Puranpur.

Junctions  

  Terminal near Maigalganj.
  near Pawayan.
  Terminal near Puranpur.

See also 

 List of National Highways in India by highway number
 List of National Highways in India by state

References

External links 

 NH 730A on OpenStreetMap

National highways in India
National Highways in Uttar Pradesh